Euprymna is a genus of bobtail squid comprising a number of species.

Species
Euprymna albatrossae (Voss, 1962)
Euprymna berryi (Sasaki, 1929), double-ear bobtail
Euprymna brenneri (Sanchez et al., 2019)
Euprymna bursa **(Pfeffer, 1884) 
Euprymna hoylei (Adam, 1986)
Euprymna hyllebergi (Nateewathana, 1997)
Euprymna megaspadicea (Kubodera & Okutani, 2002)
Euprymna morsei (Verrill, 1881), Mimika bobtail
Euprymna pardalota (Reid, 2011)
Euprymna penares  (Gray, 1849)
Euprymna phenax (Voss, 1962)
Euprymna pusilla *(Pfeffer, 1884)
Euprymna scolopes (Berry, 1913), Hawaiian bobtail squid
Euprymna schneehageni* (Pfeffer, 1884)
Euprymna stenodactyla (Grant, 1833)
Euprymna tasmanica (Pfeffer, 1884), southern dumpling squid

The species listed above with an asterisk (*) are nomen dubium and need further study to determine if they are valid species or synonyms, while a double asterisk (**) marks a taxon inquirendum.

References

External links

Bobtail squid
Cephalopod genera